Lascufloxacin (trade name Lasvic) is an fluoroquinolone antibiotic drug for the treatment of bacterial infections.  It has been approved since 2019 in Japan to treat community-acquired pneumonia, otorhinolaryngological infections, and respiratory tract infections.

It has activity against various Gram-positive bacteria including Streptococcus pneumoniae and Streptococcus anginosus.

References

Fluoroquinolone antibiotics
Cyclopropanes
Quinolines
Secondary amino acids
Methoxy compounds
Pyrrolidines